Australia competed at the 2015 Pacific Games in Port Moresby, Papua New Guinea from 4 to 18 July 2015. Australia qualified 43 athletes.  It was the first time that Australia had competed in the Pacific Games.

Australia was ranked 6th at the Games, with 47 medals ( 17 gold - 19 silver - 11 bronze ).

Rugby sevens
 

Australia qualified a team of 12 athletes.

Women
 – Women's tournament.
 Nicole Beck  (captain) (NSW)
 Brooke Anderson (NSW)
 Dom Du Toit (NSW)
 Nikki Etheridge (NSW)
 Georgie Friedrichs (QLD)
 Mollie Gray (NSW)
 Sarah Halvorsen (NSW)
 Mahalia Murphy (NSW)
 Taleena Simon (NSW)
 Tanisha Stanton (NSW)
 Laura Waldie (QLD)
 Brooke Walker (QLD)

Sailing
 

Australia qualified 3 athletes.

Women
 Carissa Bridge (QLD)

Men
 Thomas Vincent (VIC)
 Mark Spearman (WA)

Taekwondo
 

Australia qualified 12 athletes.

Women
 Deanna Kyriazopoulos (NSW)
 Keshena Waterford (ACT)
 Catherine Risbey (ACT)
 Caroline Marton (VIC)
 Carmen Marton (NSW)
 Nicole Men (ACT)
 Tassya Stevens (SA)

Men
 Thomas Auger (SA)
 Tom Afonczenko (VIC)
 Jack Marton (VIC)
 Hayder Shkara (NSW)
 Daniel Safstrom (VIC)
 Safwan Khalil (NSW)

Weightlifting

Australia qualified 15 athletes.

Women
 Mary Barter (née Witham) (QLD)
 Erika Ropati-Frost (née Yamasaki) (QLD)
 Tia-Clair Toomey (QLD)
 Kiana Elliott (NSW)
 Philippa Malone (NSW)
 Camilla Fogagnolo (TAS)
 Belinda van Tienen (VIC)

Men
 Matthew Munns (WA)
 Benjamin Shaw (QLD)
 Mitchell Delbridge (QLD)
 Malek Chamoun (NSW)
 Francois Etoundi* (VIC)
 Liam Larkins (VIC)
 Zac Grgurevic (VIC)
 Philip Wood (VIC)

* Subject to selection conditions

References

2015 in Australian sport
Nations at the 2015 Pacific Games
Australia at the Pacific Games